Ribonuclease V (endoribonuclease V) is an enzyme. This enzyme catalyses the following chemical reaction

 Hydrolysis of poly(A), forming oligoribonucleotides and ultimately 3'-AMP

This enzyme also hydrolyses poly(U).

References

External links 

EC 3.1.27